The Rural Municipality of Wellington No. 97 is a rural municipality (RM) in the Canadian province of Saskatchewan within Census Division No. 2 and  Division No. 1. It is located in the southeast portion of the province.

History 
The RM of Wellington No. 97 incorporated as a rural municipality on December 13, 1909.

Geography

Communities and localities 
The following unincorporated communities are within the RM.

Localities
Cedoux (dissolved as a village, July 21, 1913)
Colfax
Rainton
Tyvan (dissolved as a village, July 1, 1936)

Demographics 

Government 
The RM of Wellington No. 97 is governed by an elected municipal council and an appointed administrator that meets on the first Wednesday of every month. The reeve of the RM is Kelly Schneider while its administrator is Heather Wawro. The RM's office is located in Weyburn.

References 

Wellington

Division No. 2, Saskatchewan